Haythornthwaite is an English surname, meaning the meadow or clearing in the hawthorn trees. Notable people with this surname include the following:

 Ethel Haythornthwaite (1894-1986), British environmentalist and pioneer of the countryside movement
 Caroline Haythornthwaite, Canadian academic in information sciences
 Joan Haythorne, (born Haythornthwaite) British actress
 Natalie Haythornthwaite, English netball player
 Philip Haythornthwaite (born 1951), English military historian
 Richard Haythornthwaite, British business executive

English-language surnames